TECS, formerly known as the Treasury Enforcement Communications System, is used by the U.S. Department of Homeland Security to manage the flow of people through border ports of entry and for immigration enforcement case management. It keeps track of individuals entering and exiting the country and of individuals involved in or suspected to be involved in crimes. TECS alerts may be issued as part of Operation Angel Watch for people with sex offense convictions and those who travel frequently out of the country and who are possibly involved in child sex tourism.

References

Borders of the United States
Immigration to the United States
United States Department of Homeland Security